Henry Lorne Masta (born March 9, 1853) was an Abenaki writer, teacher, and scholar of the Abenaki language. He was also a respected leader in the Abenaki community. Masta published Abenaki Legends, Grammar, and Place Names in 1932. He began writing the book in 1929 at 77 years of age.  Abenaki is a member of the Algonquian languages family and is spoken in Quebec and neighboring US states. There are few native speakers—the language is spoken by only 3% of the current Abenaki population. Masta was fluent in French, English and the Abenaki language.

Early education and writing
He received his primary and secondary education at the Protestant school and church founded by his uncle, Pial Pol Wz8khilain, on the Saint Francis Indian reserve. His teacher there was tribal chief of the Abenaki at Odanak, Quebec, Joseph Laurent. Following Wzokhilain’s guide, the threesome published language texts and wrote  text books for use within the community. Laurent, also known as Sozap Lolô, is esteemed as a Native American linguist who helped preserve his own language. Ives Goddard, a noted historian of linguistics, observed of Laurent, "This is a really remarkable case of native grammatical tradition emerging among native people." The works that they wrote spanned the Five Nations and Native Americans by successfully translating Wabanki cosmology, demonstrating the continuance of names and stories associated with particular places in communal memory, even for those families who lived outside the original home territory in Quebec. In addition, Masta's Abenaki Legends, Grammar, and Place Names explains etymology pertaining to large areas of land, rivers, and traditions.

College, marriage and career
Masta later attended Sabrevois College near St-Johns, P.Q. While there, he studied Latin and Greek. In 1875, he married Caroline Tahamont. Her family was from the communities of Odanak, the Adirondacks and Saratoga Springs, New York where she and other relatives lived each summer to sell their baskets in Congress Park

For 31 years, Masta was the schoolmaster in the Protestant school at Odanak where he introduced children to the grammatical rules governing their much-forgotten language. Henry Lorne Masta went on to become chief of The St. Francis Abenaki at Odanak, and served as such for 20 years.

Recognition
In The Oxford Handbook of Indigenous American Literature, author James Howard Cox credits Masta for revitalizing the Abenaki language:

References

1853 births
Abenaki people
Canadian social sciences writers
20th-century First Nations writers
Linguistics writers
Year of death missing
20th-century Canadian male writers
20th-century Canadian non-fiction writers
First Nations academics